"I'm So Sick" is a song by American rock band Flyleaf. It was released in October 2005 as the first single off their debut album, Flyleaf (2005). It is their second song to have an accompanying music video and it has been shown on many mainstream television networks. On March 3, 2008, "I'm So Sick" was released in the UK and was played on Scuzz, Kerrang! and MTV2.

Background

The song was partly inspired by a quote from Saint Augustine's autobiography Confessions.

Song information
The introduction is played with a distorted bass guitar. Flyleaf vocalist Lacey Mosley once commented that she was surprised at how much her voice "downshifted" during the introductions.

The demo version or the first version of the song was featured on their Flyleaf (EP). The version is longer and has more lyrics. The radio edit does not feature any screaming.

The song was featured as a playable track in the 2007 video game Rock Band and  also features on the Live Free or Die Hard soundtrack.

Track listing

International single

Radio singles

Charts

References

2006 singles
Flyleaf (band) songs
2005 songs
Song recordings produced by Howard Benson
A&M Octone Records singles
Emo songs